Shineh may refer to the following places in Iran:
Shineh, Kermanshah
Shineh, Kurdistan
Shineh-ye Sharifabad, Kurdistan Province
Shineh-ye Olya, Lorestan Province
Shineh-ye Sofla, Lorestan Province
Shineh, alternate name of Cham Shateh-ye Sofla